S. spicata may refer to:
 Schenkia spicata, an annual herb species with a very wide old world distribution
 Sebastiania spicata, a plant species endemic to Jamaica

Synonyms
 Spathoglottis spicata, a synonym for Spathoglottis plicata, the large purple orchid, a terrestrial orchid species
 Stomoisia spicata, a synonym for Utricularia erectiflora, a small carnivorous plant species

See also
 Spicata (disambiguation)